Boveda Inc., formerly known as Humidipak Inc., is a manufacturing company based in Minnetonka, Minnesota, United States. It specializes in humidity control for a multitude of industries and applications. It was founded on July 1, 1997.

The company's technologies are used by cigar companies for shipping and distributing cigars, cigar connoisseurs for storing and aging fine cigars, art museums and collectors for conserving fine art, food manufacturers for extending shelf-life and improving the flavor delivered to consumers, musical instrument manufacturers and musicians for maintaining instruments over a lifetime, to extend the shelf life of cannabis, and by users for many other applications.

History

The technology behind Humidipak was co-engineered by formulations chemist Albert Saari and by Robert Esse, a packaging expert, in 1996. Saari and Esse both came from General Mills Corporation. The company was then founded on July 1, 1997. The company owns patents related to two-way humidity control for packaging, including multi-purpose Humidipaks that manage moisture, absorb oxygen and control mold.

In 2008, Rocky Patel Premium Cigars started to manufacture a custom-printed Humidipak humidity control packet in order to make the cigars properly humidified. Between 2010 and 2014, Ashton Distributors Inc., was the exclusive U.S. distributor of the Humidipak and Boveda brands for the premium cigar market. Boveda now self-distributes.

Humidipak Inc. was re-branded as Boveda Inc. in the International Premium Cigar & Pipe Retailers Association (IPCPR) 2012 convention.

Marketing and distribution
Numerous companies use the Boveda technology in their product packaging to maintain relative humidity throughout the supply chain. As of 2015, Boveda self-distributes their products for the cigar market in the United States. Internationally, Boveda has numerous distributors in Canada, South America, Southeast Asia & East Asia, Europe and South Africa. D'Addario distributes Boveda's line of Humidipak humidity control products for the music industry.

Market applications
The initial market application for Humidipak was engineered for cigars. As of 2014, Boveda is carried in over 2,500 stores globally.

Because 2-way humidity control is engineered to maintain a very specific, predetermined level of relative humidity (+/- 2% RH), the technology is being used to solve moisture-related packaging problems for many different industries and applications.

Some of these new applications are herbal medicine and medical cannabis, wooden instruments, pet food, and electronics.

Boveda products are available in many relative humidity (RH) levels ranging from 32% to 83% RH.

Awards

References

External links
 Boveda's official website
 Boveda's official blog

Manufacturing companies based in Minnesota
Manufacturing companies established in 1997
Privately held companies based in Minnesota